Palmadusta lutea is a species of sea snail, a cowry, a marine gastropod mollusk in the family Cypraeidae, the cowries.

Description

Distribution

References

 Lorenz F. (2002) New worldwide cowries. Descriptions of new taxa and revisions of selected groups of living Cypraeidae (Mollusca: Gastropoda). Schriften zur Malakozoologie aus dem Haus der Natur-Cismar 20: 1-292, pls 1-40

Cypraeidae
Gastropods described in 1791
Taxa named by Johann Friedrich Gmelin